Fire in the Hole is an enclosed roller coaster located at Silver Dollar City in Branson, Missouri. The three-story steel coaster was built in-house by Silver Dollar City in 1972. The ride is often considered a cross between a dark ride and a roller coaster. A similar ride, "Blazing Fury", was built at Herschend Family Entertainment's Silver Dollar City Tennessee, now known as Dollywood, in 1978. On February 13, 2023, Silver Dollar City announced 2023 would be the last season for the ride before it is closed permanently.

Theme

Fire in the Hole is themed around the story of Marmaros, an Ozarks hill town. Marmaros was built near Marvel Cave and is the present day site of the theme park Silver Dollar City. Marmaros grew out of necessity. The miners attracted to the mining of guano from the cave along with their families began to grow in number. The investors designed a town with the intentions of becoming a resort village such as Eureka Springs, Arkansas, or Monte Ne, Arkansas.  Investments became substantial and the town's population grew rapidly.

Marmaros’ existence relied heavily upon the mining operation of Marvel Cave. The town failed to attract tourists and began to slowly die out after mining ceased. Much of the town was later destroyed by fire, and what was left moved to a location south of the cave and is now submerged below Table Rock Lake.

The town was rumored to be burnt to the ground by a group of vigilantes known as the Baldknobbers. Obscure facts have turned into legend which makes deciphering the story virtually impossible. Some believe the burning of the village started out as a drunken fight in a local tavern. Others blame xenophobic outrage over William H. Lynch, a Canadian businessman who purchased Marvel Cave; Lynch would later open the cave as a tourist attraction. Evidence proves that the town did in fact burn, however the true story may never be established.

The original concept of the ride relied heavily upon Marvel Cave itself. During the planning phases of Fire in the Hole the ride was referred to as The Devil's Den. This was a name given to the cave centuries before mining operation had started. The ride was to include volcanoes and exploding geysers. However, modifications were eventually made and the ride took on its current form.

Fire in the Hole's dated production values and odd subject matter have made the ride a cult favorite, with some people even developing "callback lines" to shout at various points during the ride. Riders pass scenes of the town's residents trying to extinguish the flames before crossing a collapsing bridge, nearly getting run-over by a steam train, and crashing into a dynamite storage shack. In the ride's finale the coaster trains are sent hurtling over a drop into a pool of water with a splash down finish. The splash has been part of the ride since its conception. Water cannons within the splash down lake can be enhanced during the summer months to drench riders and turned off during the cooler seasons to only mist riders.

Scenes

Throughout the ride, there are many scenes of Marmaros engulfed in flames. The scenes include a burning hotel, a camp of Baldknobbers, a blazing cabin, a collapsing bridge, and a Main Street which includes a saloon, undertaker, and blacksmith shop. A shootout takes place on Main Street between three Baldknobbers and the town sheriff. This results in the undertaker's windows being shot out and bullet holes in the water tower spraying riders.

To increase rider capacity a large section of track was removed in 1982. After the first dip (Collapsing Bridge) the ride would turn right and later reconnect in front of the second one (Train Collision). At the scene where the cabin is burning, there is a moon and some stars above one of the old track areas. Also, at the sign for “Kinney Bridge”, to rider's left is a large open area where scenes once existed.

The removed scenes included one with a group of Baldknobbers having the following conversation: "All right boys remember, don't fire until you see the whites of their eyes."  A gun fires. "Ow! You damn knocked me (or you damn knock-kneed...) Oh, excuse me kids."  After that scene, the ride encounters the Baldknobber dumping the barrel on the riders (now moved to another part of the ride). This was followed by a sign reading, "Danger, Track out ahead". Coming out of the tunnel, riders saw what appeared to be the track mangled, hanging off a cliff. Just as they headed out over it, the cars cut back sharply on the real track. The track then reconnected with the existing track headed for the train hill.

Theme song
A song was created in 1972 to accompany the ride. It plays throughout the ride and on the exterior of the building. While waiting in the exterior queue-line one can hear it along with conversations between two men exclaiming the heroic deeds of firefighters.

Incidents

References

 Payton, Crystal. (1999) The Story of Silver Dollar City.  Rides and Attractions, (109)
 Fire in the Hole Operating Procedures. (2008) Information and Facts. (1,2)
 Springfield Leader & Press Friday, July 11, 1980 [1]
 Springfield Leader & Press Thursday, July 10, 1980 [2]

External links

Roller coasters in Missouri
Roller coasters introduced in 1972
Buildings and structures in Taney County, Missouri
Silver Dollar City
Roller coasters operated by Herschend Family Entertainment